The list of cannon by caliber contains all types of cannon through the ages listed in decreasing caliber size. For the purpose of this list, the development of large-calibre artillery can be divided into three periods, based on the kind of projectiles used, due to their dissimilar characteristics, and being practically incommensurable in terms of their bore size:

Stone balls: Cannon of extraordinary bore, which fired stone balls, were first introduced at the turn of the 14th to 15th century in Western Europe. Following a logic of increasing performance through size, they had evolved from small handguns to giant wrought-iron or cast-bronze bombards within a span of just several decades.
Iron balls and shot: By the 16th century, however, a general switch from stone balls to smaller, but much more effective iron projectiles was in full swing. This and the parallel tendency towards standardized, rapid-firing cannon made the enormously costly and logistically demanding giant guns soon obsolete in the European theatre (with the exception of the odd showpiece).
Explosive shells: In the Industrial Age, artillery was again revolutionized by the introduction of explosive shells, beginning with the Paixhans guns. Breakthroughs in metallurgy and modes of production were followed up by new experimentation with super-sized caliber weapons, culminating in the steel colossi of the two World Wars. In the post-war era, the development of extremely overpowered artillery was gradually abandoned in favour of missile technology, while heavy guns are still demanded by various arms of the service.

Cannon by caliber

Stone balls 
Heyday: 15th to 17th centuries

Iron balls and shot 
Heyday: 16th to 19th centuries

Twenty-inch (508 mm) Rodman and  Dahlgren smoothbore cannons were cast in 1864 during the American Civil War. The Rodmans were used as seacoast defense.

Explosive shells 
Heyday: 19th to 20th centuries

See also
List of artillery
M65 Atomic Cannon

Notes

Footnotes

References 
 

 

Large-calibre artillery
Cannon
Cannon